Jefferson Stein (born February 10, 1989) is an American filmmaker. He is best known for his 2021 film Burros, executive produced by Eva Longoria, which premiered at the 20th Annual Tribeca Film Festival and won the Jury Award in the Live Action Short category at the 25th Annual New York International Children's Film Festival, where it qualified for the 95th Annual Academy Awards.

Life and career 
Stein was born in Dallas, Texas. The oldest of four, he began making films as a child on VHS camcorders with his siblings, which evolved into making half-hour movies in his teenage years with his school friends. He graduated from Hillcrest High School and the Business Honors Program (BHP) at the University of Texas at Austin. In 2011 he made the short film, Wayfarer as part of his admission into Art Center College of Design, where he pursued an MFA in directing and studied under Allen Daviau. As a student, he won a Silver Addy Award at the American Advertising Awards.

Beyond his student work, Stein made the film, Tumble Dry Low in 2015 on a shoe-string budget of $1,500. It premiered at the Seattle International Film Festival, Tallinn Black Night Film Festival, and San Diego International Film Festival, winning the Gold Remi award in the Live Action Narrative category at the 48th WorldFest-Houston International Film Festival. It was featured on Short of the Week and released by Omeleto, where it received over 2.5 million views. With the film, Stein was included in the 2015 Shoot "New Director's Showcase."

Stein's 2015 television advertisement for American Airlines was included in Shoot's "Best Work You May Never See." In 2016, he directed documentary shorts featuring UFC Welterweight Champion Johny Hendricks and UFC contender Donald Cerrone. In 2018, Stein directed documentary shorts for VICE featuring NBA basketball player Courtney Lee and Olympic gold medalist Candace Parker about becoming the first female athlete to slam dunk in a basketball game.

In 2020, Stein's script, Man in the Maze (I'itoi), a narrative feature set in the same world as Burros, was selected as a quarterfinalist for the Academy of Motion Picture Arts and Sciences Nicholl Fellowships in Screenwriting. In 2021, his short film, Burros, premiered at the 20th Annual Tribeca Film Festival after it was developed through fiscal sponsorship by Film Independent. The film stars a cast of first-time actors from the Tohono O'odham Nation, where it is set and focuses on the Tohono O'odham living on the Mexico–United States border, immigration, and the Mexican drug war. The film qualified for the 95th Annual Academy Awards following its Jury Award win in the Live Action Short category at the 25th Annual New York International Children's Film Festival. The festival jury included Uma Thurman, Geena Davis, Matthew Modine, and Kyle MacLachlan.

Stein lives in Los Angeles.

Filmography

Awards and nominations

Film festival awards

References

External links 
 
 Jefferson Stein Mubi
 Jefferson Stein website
 Burros website

American film producers
American film directors
American male screenwriters
Art Center College of Design alumni
University of Texas at Austin alumni
Hillcrest High School (Dallas) alumni
1989 births
Living people
Writers from Dallas